Maur is a municipality in the district of Uster in the canton of Zürich in Switzerland.

History
Maur is first mentioned between 874-887 as de Mure.

Geography

Of this area, 52.6% is used for agricultural purposes, while 26.9% is forested. Of the rest of the land, 20.2% is settled (buildings or roads) and the remainder (0.3%) is non-productive (rivers, glaciers or mountains).   housing and buildings made up 14.9% of the total area, while transportation infrastructure made up the rest (5.5%). Of the total unproductive area, water (streams and lakes) made up 0% of the area.   17% of the total municipal area was undergoing some type of construction.

The municipality is located on the south-west shore of the Greifensee.  It includes the village of Maur and the settlements of Aesch, Scheuren (Forch), Binz, Ebmatingen and Uessikon.

Economy
In the Powerplay studio, almost all the important Swiss musicians and many international bands produced and recorded their hit albums, including the Bee Gees, Europe (including the song The Final Countdown), Lady Gaga, Lenny Kravitz, Prince, Snoop Dogg, Udo Jürgens and Wu-Tang Clan.

For a long time, the village was cut off from the major traffic routes. Without railways and without water-rich streams, no industry could gain a foothold in the municipality. Even today, agriculture is still an important employer, along with a few small service and craft businesses. Four-fifths of the working population earn their living outside the municipality, mostly in the city of Zurich and the surrounding towns. The number of commuters who live in Maur and work in another municipality is twice as high as the total number of people working in Maur.

Demographics
Maur has a population of 9,119, of which 17.0% are foreign nationals.   the gender distribution of the population was 49.2% male and 50.8% female.  Over the last 10 years the population has grown at a rate of 10.9%.  Most of the population speaks German  (86.4%), with English being second most common ( 3.6%) and French being third ( 2.1%).

In the 2007 election the most popular party was the SVP which received 36% of the vote.  The next three most popular parties were the FDP (19.8%), the SPS (13.9%) and the CSP (12%).

The age distribution of the population is children and teenagers (0–19 years old) make up 21.9% of the population, while adults (20–64 years old) make up 65.6% and seniors (over 64 years old) make up 12.5%.  The entire Swiss population is generally well educated.  In Maur about 88.3% of the population (between age 25-64) have completed either non-mandatory upper secondary education or additional higher education (either university or a Fachhochschule).  There are 3741 households in Maur.

Maur has an unemployment rate of 2.03%.  , there were 147 people employed in the primary economic sector and about 56 businesses involved in this sector.  389 people are employed in the secondary sector and there are 71 businesses in this sector.  1411 people are employed in the tertiary sector, with 339 businesses in this sector.   48.7% of the working population were employed full-time, and 51.3% were employed part-time.

 there were 2206 Catholics and 3997 Protestants in Maur. In the 2000 census, religion was broken down into several smaller categories. Of the rest of the population, 0% were Muslim, 4.7% belonged to another religion (not listed), 3% did not give a religion, and 18.4% were atheist or agnostic.

The historical population is given in the following table:

References

External links 

  
 

Municipalities of the canton of Zürich